The Iona Nunnery was an Augustinian convent of nuns located on the island of Iona in the Inner Hebrides of Scotland. It was established sometime after the foundation of the nearby Benedictine monastery in 1203. Bethóc, daughter of Somerled, was first prioress. The ruins of the nunnery stand in a peaceful precinct adjacent to Iona's main (and only) village, Baile Mor.  They form the most complete remains of a medieval nunnery extant in Scotland. After the Reformation, the priory was dissolved and reduced to a ruin.

History

The nunnery was founded after the establishment of the Benedictine monastery, which was likely founded by Raghnall mac Somhairle in 1203. Raghnall's sister, Bethóc, became the first prioress. This was one of the two Augustinian monasteries of women in Scotland, St. Leonards Nunnery located at Perth being the other.

In the Abbey museum of the nearby Iona Abbey, the top half of a headstone of Anna MacLean, a prioress of the monastery of nuns who died in 1543, is on display.

Restoration work on the nunnery occurred in 1923 and 1993.

Construction

The construction of the Iona Nunnery follows the typical Irish style. The Church consists of a building with three bays with a passage to the north side and a small chapel on the east side of the passage. The monastic cloister measures 14 metres square, but it was originally smaller. The east wing had three rooms on ground level, above was the dormitory. The south wing contained the refectory. In the sixteenth century a floor was added. The west wing is below the modern road and was most likely the guests wing.

Management
The Iona Nunnery is managed by Historic Environment Scotland and is a scheduled monument.

References

External links

Historic Environment Scotland - Iona Nunnery

Iona Nunnery
1203 establishments in Scotland
Nunnery
Christian religious orders established in the 13th century
Augustinian nunneries in Scotland
Historic Scotland properties in Argyll and Bute
Organisations based in Argyll and Bute
Scheduled Ancient Monuments in Argyll and Bute